Charles Gottlieb Raue or Charles Godlove Raue (11 May 1820 – 21 August 1896) was a United States homeopathic physician. 

Biography
He was born in Nieder-Kunnersdorf in Brandenburg. He graduated from the College of Teachers in Bautzen, Saxony, in 1841, and at Philadelphia Medical College in 1850. From 1864 until 1871, he was professor of pathology and practice at the Homeopathic College of Pennsylvania, and at Hahnemann Medical College in Philadelphia.

He died at his home in Philadelphia on 21 August 1896.

Writings
 Die neue Seelenlehre Dr. Beneke's, nach methodischen Grundsätzen für Lehrer bearbeitet (Bautzen, 1847)
 Special Pathology and Diagnostics with Therapeutic Hints (Philadelphia, 1868); and Annual Record of Homœopathic Literature (New York, 1870).

See also
 Friedrich Eduard Beneke

References

Further reading

External links
 
 Multiple biographies and portraits at Homéopathe International website

1820 births
1896 deaths
American homeopaths
German emigrants to the United States
People from Bautzen
People from the Province of Brandenburg
Perelman School of Medicine at the University of Pennsylvania alumni